Earl of Sussex is a title that has been created several times in the Peerages of England, Great Britain, and the United Kingdom. The early Earls of Arundel (up to 1243) were often also called Earls of Sussex.

The fifth creation came in the Peerage of Great Britain in 1717 in favour of Talbot Yelverton, 2nd Viscount Longueville. The Yelverton family descended from Sir Christopher Yelverton, Speaker of the House of Commons from 1597 to 1598. Sir Christopher's grandson and namesake, Christopher Yelverton, was created a baronet, of Easton Mauduit in the County of Northampton, in the Baronetage of England in 1641. He was succeeded by his son, Sir Henry, the second Baronet. He married Susan Longueville, suo jure 13th Baroness Grey de Ruthyn. Their eldest son, Charles, succeeded in both the baronetcy and barony. However, he died young and was succeeded by his younger brother, Henry, the fifteenth Baron. In 1690 he was created Viscount Longueville in the Peerage of England. His son, Henry, the aforementioned second Viscount, was created Earl of Sussex in 1717. Henry's two sons, George and Henry, both succeeded in the earldom. The baronetcy, viscountcy and earldom became extinct on Henry's death in 1799. He was succeeded in the barony of Grey de Ruthyn by his grandson, Henry, the nineteenth Baron, the son of his daughter Lady Barbara Yelverton by Colonel Edward Thoroton Gould. See Baron Grey de Ruthyn for further history of this title.

Earls of Sussex; First creation (1282)
John de Warenne, 1st Earl of Sussex (1231–1304)
John de Warenne, 2nd Earl of Sussex (1286–1347)

Earls of Sussex; Second creation (1529)

Robert Radcliffe, 1st Earl of Sussex (1483–1542)
Henry Radclyffe, 2nd Earl of Sussex (1507–1557)
Thomas Radclyffe, 3rd Earl of Sussex (1525–1583)
Henry Radclyffe, 4th Earl of Sussex (1532–1593)
Robert Radclyffe, 5th Earl of Sussex (1573–1629)
Edward Radclyffe, 6th Earl of Sussex (1559–1643)

Subsidiary titles: Viscount FitzWalter (1525), Baron FitzWalter (1295) (1st–5th Earls)

Baron Savile of Pontefract (1628)
John Savile, 1st Baron Savile of Pontefract (1556–1630) (Alternative spelling Baron Savile of Pomfret)
Thomas Savile, 2nd Baron Savile of Pontefract (1590 – c. 1659) (created Earl of Sussex in 1644)

Earls of Sussex, Third creation (1644)
Thomas Savile, 1st Earl of Sussex (1590–1659)
James Savile, 2nd Earl of Sussex (1647–1671)

Subsidiary titles: Viscount Savile (1628), Baron Castlebar (1628)

Earls of Sussex; Fourth creation (1674)

Thomas Lennard, 1st Earl of Sussex (1654 – 1715)

Subsidiary title: Baron Dacre (1321)

Yelverton baronets, of Easton Mauduit (1641) 
Sir Christopher Yelverton, 1st Baronet (died 1654) 
Sir Henry Yelverton, 2nd Baronet (1633-1670)
Sir Charles Yelverton, 3rd Baronet (1657-1679) (succeeded as Baron Grey de Ruthyn in 1676)

Barons Grey de Ruthyn (1324)
Charles Yelverton, 14th Baron Grey de Ruthyn (1657-1679)
Henry Yelverton, 15th Baron Grey de Ruthyn (died 1704) (created Viscount Longueville in 1690)

Viscounts Longueville (1690)

Henry Yelverton, 1st Viscount Longueville (died 1704) 
Talbot Yelverton, 2nd Viscount Longueville (1690–1731) (created Earl of Sussex in 1717)

Earls of Sussex; Fifth creation (1717)
Talbot Yelverton, 1st Earl of Sussex (1690–1731)
George Augustus Yelverton, 2nd Earl of Sussex (1727–1758)
Henry Yelverton, 3rd Earl of Sussex (1728–1799)
Talbot Yelverton

Earls of Sussex; Sixth creation (1874)
The Prince Arthur, 1st Duke of Connaught and Strathearn, 1st Earl of Sussex (1850–1942)
Prince Arthur of Connaught (1883–1938)
Alastair Arthur Windsor, 2nd Duke of Connaught and Strathearn, 2nd Earl of Sussex (1914–1943)

See also
Duke of Sussex
Earl of Arundel
Yelverton baronets
Baron Grey de Ruthyn

References

External links
 
 Sussex, Earl of (E, 1644 - 1671)
 Sussex, Earl of (E, 1674 - 1715)
 Sussex, Earl of (GB, 1717 - 1799)

 
Extinct earldoms in the Peerage of England
Extinct earldoms in the Peerage of Great Britain
History of Sussex
Extinct earldoms in the Peerage of the United Kingdom
Noble titles created in 1282
Noble titles created in 1329
Noble titles created in 1644
Noble titles created in 1674
Noble titles created in 1717
Noble titles created in 1874